The World War I Memorial of Norfolk, Connecticut stands at the corner of Greenwoods Road West and North Street in the town's village center.  The Rustic style memorial was built in 1921 to a design by New York City architect Alfredo S.G. Taylor.  It was added to the National Register of Historic Places in 1984 for its association with the architect.

Description and history
Norfolk's World War I Memorial stands in a triangular grassy area at the junction of Greenwoods Road West and North Street, near the northern end of the village center. Each of its three legs rises in a bellcast shape to a common peak, beneath which hangs a replica of the Liberty Bell. Bronze tablets commemorating the town's World War I soldiers are placed on each of the monument's curved triangular faces, just above stone bench projections.

The memorial was designed by Alfredo S.G. Taylor, an architect based in New York City who spent many summers in Norfolk.  He is credited with more than thirty commissions in the community, including public and commercial buildings as well as many private residences.  The memorial was dedicated in 1921.  It is stylistically in keeping with Taylor's previous uses of stone and rustic styling.  In giving him the commission, the town laid down four requirements:
It should be large enough to express the forces of war
It should avoid the need for a sculpture
It should be made of local materials
It should be simple enough to be constructed by the relatives of the war dead

See also
National Register of Historic Places listings in Litchfield County, Connecticut

References

Monuments and memorials on the National Register of Historic Places in Connecticut
Buildings and structures completed in 1921
Norfolk, Connecticut
National Register of Historic Places in Litchfield County, Connecticut
World War I memorials in the United States
1921 establishments in Connecticut